Voždovac Stadium, also known as Stadion Shopping Center, is a football stadium in Belgrade, Serbia, and is the home ground of Voždovac. One of the few rooftop stadiums in the world, it is built on the top of a shopping center in Voždovac and opened in August 2013.

History
After the old venue of Voždovac was demolished, the new stadium began construction in 2011 along with the establishment of a new shopping center in the Zaplanjska street in Voždovac. It has a seating capacity of 5,175. The stadium meets all UEFA standards for matches in the UEFA Europa League and the UEFA Champions League.

References

External links

Football venues in Serbia
Multi-purpose stadiums in Serbia
Sports venues in Belgrade
2013 establishments in Serbia
American football venues in Europe
Voždovac
Sports venues completed in 2013